The Fiat Phylla concept car was unveiled in 2008 by the Italian car manufacture Fiat. Originally expected to form the basis of a production car in 2010, it remains a concept city car. The Phylla name means "leaves" in ancient Greek.

Specification
The recyclable Phylla is powered by a 1kW hydrogen fuel cell and comes equipped with 340W of photovoltaic solar cells and weighs ,  of which is batteries. The split-frame vehicle is made of a mix of aluminum and bioplastics.

Project team
The Phylla was developed by Centro Ricerche Fiat (which as vehicle project leader was responsible for the technical and architectural decisions involved in developing the demonstrator vehicle) in combination with the Piedmont regional administration (which sponsored and funded the project), the Environment Park (which helped define and select innovative technologies for the environment) and the Politecnico di Torino (responsible for the overall management of the project and coordination of the partners).

References

Hydrogen cars
Solar-powered vehicles
Phylla